Petr Kunc (born 12 October 2000) is a professional Czech football midfielder currently playing for Ústí nad Labem in the Czech National Football League.

He made his senior league debut for Ústí on 23 October 2016 in a Czech National Football League 2–0 away loss at Žižkov at the age of 16 years and 11 days.

References

External links
 

Czech footballers
2000 births
Living people
Czech National Football League players
FK Ústí nad Labem players
Association football midfielders